The Lloyds TSB Act 1998 is a private Act of the United Kingdom Parliament, to provide for the transfer to and vesting in Lloyds Bank plc of the undertakings of TSB Bank plc and Hill Samuel Bank Limited (members of the Lloyds TSB Group); and for connected purposes.

Background
The Lloyds TSB merger was structured as a reverse takeover; Lloyds Bank Plc was delisted from the London Stock Exchange and TSB Group plc was renamed Lloyds TSB Group plc on 28 December 1995, with former Lloyds Bank shareholders owning a 70 per cent equity interest in the share capital, effected through a scheme of arrangement.

Objectives
The new bank commenced trading in 1999, after the statutory process of integration was completed. On 28 June, TSB Bank plc transferred engagements to Lloyds Bank plc which then changed its name to Lloyds TSB Bank plc; at the same time, TSB Bank Scotland plc absorbed Lloyds' three Scottish branches becoming Lloyds TSB Scotland plc.

See also

HBOS Group Reorganisation Act 2006

External links
Lloyds TSB Act 1998

United Kingdom Acts of Parliament 1998
Lloyds Banking Group
Banking legislation in the United Kingdom